Elita may refer to:

Elita (cigarette), a Latvian brand
Elita (name), a list of people with the given name
"Elita" (song), by Gary Barlow, Michael Bublé, and Sebastián Yatra, 2020
Cyclone Elita, 2004
Elita One or Elita, a female Transformer
Elita (brachiopod), a brachiopod genus
Elita (lingerie), a brand of lingerie

See also
 Aelita (disambiguation)
 Alita (disambiguation)
 Aleta (disambiguation)